Joshua James Austerfield (born 2 November 2001) is an English professional footballer who plays as a midfielder for Morecambe, on loan from the Championship club Huddersfield Town.

Career
Born in Morley, Austerfield moved to Huddersfield Town at the age of eight from his local club in Drighlington. After progressing through the club's academy, he moved on loan to Brighouse Town in March 2020. He was sent off on his début, as a substitute in a defeat against Workington.

Austerfield made his senior debut for Huddersfield Town on 5 September 2020, when he played as a substitute in the club's EFL Cup defeat against Rochdale.

On 9 January 2021, Austerfield made his first professional start for Huddersfield start against Plymouth Argyle. 

He made 23 appearances for the B team and the under-19s, who he often captains.

On 14 December 2020, Austerfield joined the Northern Premier League club Hyde United on a 28-day loan.

On 4 January 2022, he joined the EFL League Two side Harrogate Town on loan for the remainder of the 2021–22 season.

On 21 June 2022, Austerfield and his teammate Jaheim Headley joined Harrogate on loan for the 2022–23 season.

On 31 January 2023, Austerfield's loan at Harrogate was ended, so he could join EFL League One side Morecambe for the rest of the 2022–23 season.

References

External links

2001 births
Living people
Huddersfield Town A.F.C. players
Hyde United F.C. players
Harrogate Town A.F.C. players
Morecambe F.C. players
Association football midfielders
English footballers
English Football League players
Northern Premier League players
Footballers from Leeds